365 Head, also called 2 KLD is a village in Ganganagar district of Rajasthan, India. It is located in the south-western region of Gharsana Tehsil, 198.2 kilometers from Ganganagar. 365 Head has gram panchayat (an Indian rural administration unit) status. It is named after the 365 R.D. of Anoopgarh branch canal.

Culture
Bagri, Punjabi, Hindi, Sindhi and Marwari languages are spoken there. People practice Hindu, Sikh, Baudh and Islam religions.

Education

Colleges
 M.D. College (Arts and computer)

Schools

Senior secondary schools
  Govt. senior secondary school
  Oxford Children Academy Sr. Sec School [art] mandi 365 head

Secondary schools
 Durga Public Secondary School
 Sharda Bal Niketan Secondary School

Upper Primary Schools
 Sarswati Vidya Vihar Upper Primary School
 Ravinder Nath Tagore Upper Primary School
 Swami Vivekanand Memorial Upper Primary School
 Sanskar Academy English Medium School

Computer Education Center 
 Career Defense Academy 365 Head
 Tathagat Computer Education Center

Location 
365 head is in the southernmost part of Shriganganagar district.  It is 200  km from Shri Ganganagar and 135  km  from Bikaner. It is situated on the Indo-Pakistani border.

References

Villages in Sri Ganganagar district